Hautot-l’Auvray is a commune in the Seine-Maritime department in the Normandy region in northern France.

Geography

Population

Places of interest
 The church of St.Martin, dating from the thirteenth century.
 The fourteenth century chapel of Notre-Dame.

See also
Communes of the Seine-Maritime department

References

External links

 Website of Hautot l'Auvray 

Communes of Seine-Maritime